Tiago Manuel Fernandes Ribeiro (born 15 June 1992 in Zürich, Switzerland) is a Portuguese footballer who plays as a defensive midfielder. He also holds Swiss citizenship.

External links

1992 births
Living people
Swiss people of Portuguese descent
Footballers from Zürich
Portuguese footballers
Association football midfielders
Liga Portugal 2 players
Segunda Divisão players
F.C. Vizela players
S.C. Braga B players
Indian Super League players
Mumbai City FC players
Portugal youth international footballers
Portuguese expatriate footballers
Expatriate footballers in Switzerland
Expatriate footballers in India
Expatriate footballers in Norway
Expatriate footballers in Luxembourg
Portuguese expatriate sportspeople in Switzerland
Portuguese expatriate sportspeople in India
Portuguese expatriate sportspeople in Norway